3rd Filmfare Awards East ceremony, presented by the Filmfare Magazine, will honor the best Bengali language Indian films of 2017. The ceremony will be held on 17 February 2018 and will be co-hosted by Parambrata Chatterjee and Abir Chatterjee.

Winners and nominees

Main Awards 
The nominees for the 3rd Filmfare Awards East were announced on 13 February 2018.
{| class="wikitable"
|-
! ! style="background:#eedd82; text-align:center;"|Best Film
! ! style="background:#eedd82; text-align:center;"|Best Director
|-
| valign="top" |
 Bishorjan
 Amazon Obhijaan
 Bibaho Diaries
 Maacher Jhol
 Mayurakshi
 Sahaj Paather Gappo
| valign="top" |
 Kaushik Ganguly - Bishorjan
 Atanu Ghosh - Mayurakshi
 Kamaleswar Mukherjee - Cockpit
 Manas Mukul Pal - Sahaj Paather Gappo
 Pratim D. Gupta - Maacher Jhol
 Shiboprosad Mukherjee and Nandita Roy - Posto
|-
! ! style="background:#eedd82; text-align:center;"|Best Actor 
! ! style="background:#eedd82; text-align:center;"|Best Actress
|-
|
 Prosenjit Chatterjee - Mayurakshi
 Dev - Chaamp
 Jisshu Sengupta - Posto
 Ritwick Chakraborty - Bibaho Diaries
 Soumitra Chatterjee - Mayurakshi
|
 Jaya Ahsan   - Bishorjan
 Ishaa Saha - Projapoti Biskut Rukmini Maitra - Cockpit
 Swastika Mukherjee - Asamapto
 Sohini Sarkar - Bibaho Diaries
|-
! ! style="background:#eedd82; text-align:center;"|Best Supporting Actor
! ! style="background:#eedd82; text-align:center;"|Best Supporting Actress
|-
|
 Kaushik Ganguly - Bishorjan Abir Chatterjee - Meghnad Badh Rahasya
 Bratya Basu - Asamapto
 Paran Bandopadhyay - Posto
 Riddhi Sen - Samantaral
|
 Mamata Shankar - Maacher Jhol Arjaa Bannerjee - Dhananjay
 Lily Chakravarty - Posto
 Sneha Biswas - Sahaj Paather Gappo
 Tonushree Chakraborty - Durga Sohay
|-
! ! style="background:#eedd82; text-align:center;"|Best Music Director
! ! style="background:#eedd82; text-align:center;"|Best Lyricist
|-
|
 Anindya Chatterjee, Anupam Roy, Shantanu Moitra and Prasenjit Mukherjee - Projapoti Biskut Savvy Gupta - Bibaho Diaries
 Late Kalika Prasad Bhattacharya - Bishorjan
 Anupam Roy - Maacher Jhol
 Anupam Roy and Anindya Chatterjee - Posto
 Indraadip Das Gupta - Samantaral
|
 Ritam Sen - "Tomake Bujhina Priyo" - Projapoti Biskut Anindya Chatterjee - "Jonaki" - Posto
 Anupam Roy - "Dawttok" - Maacher Jhol
 Debojyoti Mishra - "Tomra Ekhono Ki" - Meghnad Badh Rahasya
 Sharmin Sultana Sumi - "Ahare Jibon" - Doob
 Srijato - "Dyakha Howbe Bole" - Samantaral
|-
! ! style="background:#eedd82; text-align:center;"|Best Playback Singer - Male
! ! style="background:#eedd82; text-align:center;"|Best Playback Singer - Female
|-
|
 Nachiketa Chakraborty - "Keno Erokom Kichhu Holo Na" - Posto Anindya Chatterjee - "Jonaki" - Posto
 Anupam Roy and Saheb Chatterjee - "Je Tore Pagol Bole" - Maacher Jhol
 Arijit Singh - "Maula Re" - Chaamp
 Arijit Singh - "Tui Chunli Jakhan" - Samantaral
 Anupam Roy - "Dawttok" - Maacher Jhol
|
 Chandrani Banerjee - "Tomake Bujhina Priyo" - Projapoti Biskut Iman Chakraborty - "Bhalo Koira Bajao Go" - Durga Sohay
 Lagnajita Chakraborty - "E Bhabe Golpo Hok" - Bibaho Diaries
 Nikhita Gandhi - "Tomra Ekhono Ki" - Meghnad Badh Rahasya
 Sharmin Sultana Sumi  - "Ahare Jibon" - Doob
 Shreya Ghoshal - "Tui Chunli Jakhan" - Samantaral
|-
! ! style="background:#eedd82; text-align:cebter;"|Best Debut Male
! ! style="background:#eedd82; text-align:cebter;"|Best Debut Female
|-
|
 Nur Islam - Sahaj Paather Gappo Samiul Alam - Sahaj Paather Gappo Aditya Sengupta – Projapoti Biskut
 Arghya Basu Roy - Posto
|

 Rukmini Maitra - Chaamp, Cockpit' Anusha Vishwanathan - Durga Sohay Arjaa Baneerjee - Dhananjay Ida Dasgupta - Shob Bhooturey Ishaa Saha – Projapoti Biskut|}

Critics' awards

Technical Awards

Special awards

Multiple Nominations

 Bishorjan - 14
 Maacher Jhol - 13
 Sahaj Paather Gappo - 12
 Bibaho Diaries - 10
 Mayurakshi - 10
 Projapoti Biskut - 10
 Posto - 9
 Samantaral - 8
 Meghnad Badh Rahasya - 8
 Doob - 5
 Durga Sohay - 4
 Dhananjay - 4
 Chaamp - 3
 Cockpit - 3
 Byomkesh O Agnibaan - 2
 Asamapto - 2

Multiple Awards
 Bishorjan - 6
 Projapoti Biskut - 6
 Mayurakshi - 4
 Sahaj Paather Gappo - 4
 Maacher Jhol'' - 2

References

Filmfare Awards
2017 film awards
2017 in India
Events of The Times Group